Popcorn was an Italian pop music show which ran 1980–1985 on Canale 5 produced by Berlusconi's Fininvest. Hosts included Sammy Barbot, Tiziana Fiorveluti, Claudio Cecchetto, Augusto Martelli, Italy-based US singer Ronnie Jones and English actress Karina Huff.

References

Pop music television series